China Longyuan Power Group Limited, or Longyuan Power, is the largest wind power producer in China and Asia. It is mainly engaged in designing, developing, managing and operating wind power plants, and selling the electricity generated by its plants to its sole customers. As of June 2013, the company had installed wind power plants with a total capacity of 10,661 MW.

Longyuan Power is a partially owned subsidiary of the state-owned China Energy Investment, and is responsible for China Energy's renewable energy assets. It had a 24 percent share of China's wind power market in terms of total installed capacity as of the end of 2008. It was listed on the Hong Kong Stock Exchange as H share in December 2009 with an IPO price of HK$8.16 per share.

See also

Wind power in China

References

External links
China Longyuan Power Group Limited 

Companies formerly in the Hang Seng China Enterprises Index
Companies listed on the Hong Kong Stock Exchange
Energy companies established in 1993
Government-owned companies of China
Wind power companies of China
1993 establishments in China